Young Man's Fancy may refer to:
A quotation from the poem "Locksley Hall" by Lord Tennyson
"Young Man's Fancy" (The Twilight Zone), an episode of the TV series The Twilight Zone
Young Man's Fancy (film), a 1939 British film
Young Man's Fancy, a 1952 short film
 "Young Man's Fancy", a jazz composition written by Vince Guaraldi